Atlantic City Fashion Week or ACFW is a fashion event held two times every year, Spring and Fall.

The event features activities that include fashion shows, seminars, celebrity appearances, retail events, networking opportunities and industry parties. Atlantic City Fashion Week features an eclectic group of designers, national retailers, boutiques and novice design students. Designers from England, Hungary, Russia, Australia, Haiti, Trinidad, Senegal, the Dominican Republic and all parts of the United States have showcased their collections at our runway event. Retailers have included Michael Kors, Tommy Bahama, OshKosh B'Gosh, Invicta, Brooks Brothers, Tiffany's and Abercrombie and Fitch. Atlantic City Fashion Week has also been a showcase for designers from the hit television series Project Runway. Those designers have included Dom Streater, Helen Castillo and Lantie Foster, as well as Philadelphia's men's designer LeGrand Leseur. Atlantic City Fashion Week has held its events at a variety of venues on the world-famous Atlantic City Boardwalk including "The Pier Shops at Caesars" (now "Playground Pier"), Bally's Atlantic City, and the Claridge Hotel.

History

References

External links
 

Fashion events in the United States
Atlantic City, New Jersey
Fashion weeks